Devon Millington (born 11 December 1983) is a semi-professional footballer who plays as a midfielder for Slingerz FC and the Guyana national team.

Career

Club career 
Millington began his career with Georgetown FC, where he spent two seasons. In 2005, he joined Western Tigers, but in his fifth season with the club saw them relegated to the second tier. He then joined Alpha United in 2010, and in four seasons stormed to success in the Guyana Super League on four separate occasions. Millington moved to Slingerz FC in 2015.

International career 
Millington made his international debut for Guyana on 8 August 2008, playing in a 3-0 win over Dominica in the 2008 Caribbean Championships. He made a further two appearances in the competition, but failed to make the scoresheet.

He scored his first international goal on 28 October 2009, scoring the only goal in a 1-0 win against Suriname in the Suriname Independence Cup. His second goal came just two days later, scoring in a 1-0 victory over Netherlands Antilles in the same competition. Millington scored twice during the 2010 Caribbean Cup, against Suriname and Saint Vincent and the Grenadines.

International goals
Scores and results list Guyana's goal tally first.

Personal life 
In November 2010, Millington's mother suggested he was being victimised by the Guyana Football Federation. The forward was not included in the squad to play English side Cray Wanderers or Guatemala in the United States, sparking her claims.

References 

1983 births
Living people
Association football forwards
Guyanese footballers
Alpha United FC players
Slingerz FC players
Georgetown FC players
Western Tigers FC players
Guyana international footballers